The Amritsar Delhi Kolkata Industrial corridor (ADKIC) is a proposed economic corridor in India between the cities of Amritsar, Delhi and Kolkata, developed by the Government of India.

The project is aimed at developing an Industrial Zone spanning across seven states in India and 20 cities under these states. The project is intended to bring about major expansion of infrastructure and industry in the states along the route of the corridor.

The corridor encompasses one of the most densely populated regions in the world and houses about 40% of India's population. This is a region which needs a major push for industrialization and job creation. 

, the Government of India has approved the project.

Development
The Minister said these projects are important in terms of boosting the manufacturing sector in the country as it would help in creating millions of jobs.

States included
The ADKIC will be spread across 20 cities in seven states: Punjab, Haryana, Uttar Pradesh, Uttarakhand, Bihar, Jharkhand and West Bengal, extending  from Ludhiana in Punjab to Dankuni near Kolkata . The cities which will covered by the ADKIC Project are Amritsar, Jalandhar, Ludhiana, Ambala, Saharanpur, Delhi, Roorkee, Haridwar, Dehradun, 
Meerut, Muzaffarnagar, Bareilly, Aligarh, Kanpur, Lucknow, Allahabad, Varanasi, Gaya, Hazaribagh, Bokaro Steel City, Dhanbad, Asansol, Durgapur, Burdwan and Kolkata. The corridor would be built along the 1,839 km long Eastern Dedicated Freight corridor between Khurja and Mugalsarai, and will leverage the Inland Waterway System being developed along National Waterway 1 which extends from Allahabad to Haldia. The IMG has also proposed to integrate the existing highway network.

See also
 India's National Industrial Corridor Programme
 Delhi-Mumbai Industrial Corridor
 Chennai Bangalore Industrial Corridor
 Mumbai-Bangalore economic corridor
 Visakhapatnam–Chennai Industrial Corridor

References

External Links 
 

Proposed infrastructure in India
Economy of West Bengal
Economy of Kolkata
Economy of Bihar
Economy of Punjab, India
Economy of Jharkhand
Economy of Delhi
Economy of Uttar Pradesh
Economy of Uttarakhand
Economy of Haryana
Industrial corridors in India